Robert J. Miller Air Park , also known as the Ocean County Airport, is a county-owned public-use airport in Ocean County, New Jersey, United States. It is located five nautical miles (6 mi, 9 km) southwest of the central business district of Toms River, New Jersey.

Opened in 1968 as the Ocean County Air-Park, the airport is named after Ocean County Freeholder Robert J. Miller, who worked to expand the airport while in office. Miller died in 1969 in an accident that occurred at the airport; it was named after him in 1970.

This airport is included in the FAA's National Plan of Integrated Airport Systems for 2011–2015, which categorized it as a general aviation airport.

Facilities and aircraft 
The airport covers an area of 232 acres (94 ha) at an elevation of 81 feet (25 m) above mean sea level. It has two asphalt runways designated 6/24 (measuring 5,950 by 100 feet or 1,814 x 30 m) and 14/32 (measuring 3,599 by 75 feet or 1,097 x 23 m). It also has a helipad designated H1 (measuring 100 by 100 feet or 30 x 30 m).

For the 12-month period ending March 19, 2010, the airport had 31,625 general aviation aircraft operations, an average of 86 per day. At that time there were 65 aircraft based at this airport: 89% single-engine and 11% multi-engine.

References

External links 
 Ocean County Airport
 Aerial image as of 16 April 1995 from USGS The National Map
 

Airports in New Jersey
Transportation buildings and structures in Ocean County, New Jersey